María Elisa Quinteros Cáceres (born 20 December 1981) is a Chilean professor who was elected as a member of the Chilean Constitutional Convention. On January 5, 2022, she was elected as the President of the Constitutional Convention after 9 rounds of voting.

References

External links
 

1981 births
Living people
21st-century Chilean politicians
Members of the Chilean Constitutional Convention
University of Talca alumni
University of Chile alumni
21st-century Chilean women politicians